Aethecerinus is a genus of beetles in the family Cerambycidae, containing the following species:

 Aethecerinus hornii (Lacordaire, 1869)
 Aethecerinus latecinctus (Horn, 1880)
 Aethecerinus wilsonii (Horn, 1860)

References

Trachyderini
Cerambycidae genera